Mahabubnagar is a city in Mahabubnagar District of the Indian state of Telangana named after the 6th Nizam, Mahboob Ali Khan. It is the headquarters of Mahabubnagar mandal in Mahabubnagar revenue division.

Geography 
It has an average elevation of 498 metres (1633 feet). The city of Mahbub Nagar is located at a distance of 98 km from Hyderabad 130 km from Kurnool and 105 km from Raichur.

Demographics 
In 2011, Mahbub Nagar had a population of 222,573 It is the 9th largest city of south India by number of auto rickshaws, and 2nd in Telangana after Hyderabad.

Governance 
Mahbub Nagar municipality is the civic body of the city, which was constituted in 1942 as a third grade municipality. It was upgraded to second grade in 1959, to first grade in 1983 and finally to Special grade municipality in 2004. Mahbub Nagar urban agglomeration consists of Mahbub Nagar municipality, census towns of Boyapalle, Yenugonda and the out growths of Mahbub Nagar (rural) (full), Yedira (part) village.

Economy
Mahabubnagar has an upcoming IT Tower under construction and scheduled to be completed in 2023 as part of KTR’s mantra of ‘3-D’ (Digitise, Decarbonise and Decentralise).

Transport 

The city is connected to major cities and towns by means of road, railway and airway. National and state highways that pass through the city are NH 44 and NH 167, State highway 20 and 23. TSRTC operates buses to various destinations from Mahbub Nagar bus station of the city. Rajiv Gandhi International Airport is only 75 kms from the city.

Railway
The city has rail connectivity with the presence of MahbubNagar Main Station, Mahbub Nagar Town, Yenugonda Station and Diviti Pally Stations.

Notable people 

 Jaipal Reddy – Outstanding Parliamentarian , Former leader of Opposition in Rajya Sabha
 Burgula Ramakrishna Rao – First elected Chief Minister of Hyderabad State
 Pramod Mahajan – Former Union Minister
 Revanth Reddy – politician
 Mallikarjun Goud – Former Union Minister
 D. K. Aruna – BJP National Vice President , Ex-Minister of state
 Venkatarama Reddy – kotwal
 J. Rameshwar Rao – Former MP ,Diplomat , Orient Longman Publishers founder
 Chitlem Narsi Reddy – Former Deputy Speaker of AP Assembly
 Jupally Krishna Rao – Former Minister
 A. P. Jithender Reddy – Former MP , businessman
 C. Laxma Reddy – Former Minister
 Gona Budda Reddy – Poet and king (13th Century)
 Nagam Janardhan Reddy – Former Minister
 Ravula Chandra Sekar Reddy – politician
 Ravula Ravindranath Reddy – politician
 Singireddy Niranjan Reddy – Lawyer and politician
 Suravaram Pratapa Reddy – freedom fighter and writer
 Goreti Venkanna – writer and singer
 Tejaswini Manogna – Miss Earth India 2019
 Manda Jagannath – Former MP
 Kapilavai Lingamurthy – Poet and writer

Climate

References

External links 

 Mahabubnagar Official Government Website

Cities in Telangana
District headquarters of Telangana
Municipal corporations in Telangana